Pennsylvania Railroad class E2b comprised six experimental B-B electric locomotives built for the railroad by General Electric. 

In 1952 the Pennsylvania Railroad took delivery of eight experimental locomotives:
 4 locomotives of the class E2b with the road numbers  #4939–#4942 built by General Electric
 2 locomotives of the class E3c with the road numbers  #4995 and #4996 built by Baldwin-Lima-Hamilton & Westinghouse
 2 locomotives of the class E3b the road numbers  #4997 and #4998 built by Baldwin-Lima-Hamilton & Westinghouse
GE built two demonstrators to show the Great Northern Railway. These two were sold to the PRR in March 1953 and numbered .

The class E2b locomotives were commonly used in three pairs.  Like most previous PRR electric locomotives, they were straight AC-powered, and did not use rectifiers.  Because of this, they could work in multiple with existing PRR locomotives, and generally did so with class P5a.

The locomotives were scrapped in 1964.

Notes

References
 
 
 

11 kV AC locomotives
E2b
General Electric locomotives
B-B locomotives
Experimental locomotives
Electric locomotives of the United States
Standard gauge locomotives of the United States
Railway locomotives introduced in 1952
Scrapped locomotives

Streamlined electric locomotives